Jacob Kasher Hindlin (born October 1, 1983), also known as J Kash and JKash, is an American songwriter and record producer. He has written songs for artists such as Charlie Puth, Maroon 5, One Direction, Dua Lipa, Britney Spears, Selena Gomez, Kesha, Ariana Grande, Lady Gaga, Katy Perry, Jason Derulo, Meghan Trainor, and many others. He has co-written three Billboard Hot 100 number-one songs: Kesha's "We R Who We R" (2010), Jawsh 685's "Savage Love (Laxed - Siren Beat) (with Jason Derulo)" (2020), and Morgan Wallen's "Last Night" (2023). Additionally, he has written five Top 40 Radio number-one songs including: Maroon 5's "Sugar" (2015), "Don't Wanna Know (featuring Kendrick Lamar)" (2016), and "Memories" (2019), Charlie Puth's "Attention" (2017), and Jawsh 685's "Savage Love (Laxed - Siren Beat) (with Jason Derulo)" (2020). He has also won 14 ASCAP Songwriting Awards and is the founder of the record label Sandlot Records.

Music career 
Hindlin grew up in Virginia Beach, Virginia. After trying to make it as a rapper in Virginia, Hindlin moved to Miamiwhere he quickly befriended producer Kevin Rudolf. He and Rudolf went on to craft Rudolf's entire 2008 debut album In the City. Shortly after the success of In the City, Hindlin moved to Los Angeles, CA.

In 2010, Hindlin signed with publishing company Prescription Songs. 

In 2017, Hindlin executive produced Maroon 5's 6th and 7th studio albums Red Pill Blues and Jordi. He has also worked extensively with Meghan Trainor, Katy Perry, and Charlie Puth, helping to craft five songs on Trainor's 2016 album Thank You, eight songs on Perry's 2020 album Smile, 11 of the 13 songs on Puth's 2018 album Voicenotes, and all 12 songs on Puth's 2022 album Charlie.

Hindlin founded an independent record label Sandlot Records in 2020 and has since signed deals with artists such as Addison Rae, Huddy, Daya, Cxloe, Niko Rubio, and Babygirl.

In 2022, Hindlin was named one of Genius' Top 25 Songwriters of 2022.

Discography

Songwriting credits

Production credits

Awards and nominations

References 

1983 births
Living people